To celebrate 20 years of Rinspeed, Frank Rinderknecht created the 1997 Rinspeed Mono Ego. The French fashion designer Jean-Charles de Castelbajac was involved in its design. It was shown at the Geneva Motor Show.

References

External links
Official website of Rinspeed
Photos at Rinspeed's website

Concept cars

Rinspeed vehicles